Heddleichthys is a genus of prehistoric sarcopterygian (lobe-finned "fish"), from the end of the Devonian period (Famennian). It was discovered in Dura Den Formation, Scotland. Heddleichthys is a derived tristichopterid, the first from Britain.

References

Tristichopterids
Prehistoric lobe-finned fish genera
Devonian bony fish
Fossil taxa described in 2009
Devonian fish of Europe